Roger T. Ames (born 12 December 1947) is a Canadian-born philosopher, translator, and author. He is Humanities Chair Professor at Peking University in Beijing, China, Professor Emeritus of Philosophy at the University of Hawaiʻi at Mānoa, and a Berggruen Fellow. He has made significant contributions to the study of Chinese and comparative philosophy, in which he emphasizes the importance of understanding Chinese philosophy on its own terms rather than through the lens of Western philosophy.

Biography 
Roger Ames was born in Toronto, Canada, and raised in England and Vancouver. He is married with two sons. He received his bachelorʻs degree from the University of British Columbia (UBC) where he studied philosophy and Chinese language. While attending UBC, he took the opportunity to spend one academic year at the Chinese University of Hong Kong, his first exposure to China. After graduating from UBC, he began his graduate work at National Taiwan University (1970–1972), where he studied with Yang Youwei (楊有維). He returned to UBC to finish his master's degree (1973), then he spent two years living in Japan. In 1975, he began his Ph.D. at the School of Oriental and African Studies (SOAS) at the University of London, where he studied under the tutelage of D. C. Lau. He completed his Ph.D. thesis in 1978, titled The "Chu Shu" chapter of the Huai-Nan-Tzu: The sources and orientation of its political thought. That same year, he accepted an offer for an assistant professorship from the University of Hawaiʻi at Mānoa, and he remained there until he retired in 2016. He is currently Humanities Chair Professor at Peking University in Beijing, China.

Accomplishments 
While a member of the faculty at the University of Hawaiʻi at Mānoa (UHM), Ames joined Eliot Deutsch, already a prominent academic and advocate of Chinese and comparative philosophy, and others to continue the tradition begun by Charles A. Moore and Wing-Tsit Chan to establish UHM as the hub for non-Western and comparative philosophy and intellectual exchange in the United States. Ames became the editor of the academic journal Philosophy East and West in 1987, the editor of the book review publication China Review International, the editor and co-editor (with David L. Hall) of the "Chinese Philosophy and Culture" Series as well as (with Paul J. D'Ambrosio) the "Translating China" series with State University of New York Press. He also served as Director for the Center for Chinese Studies at UHM and Co-Director (with Peter D. Hershock) for the Asian Studies Development Program (ASDP), and as Director and Co-Director of the East-West Philosophers' Conferences, the largest gathering of non-Western and comparative philosophers, with as many as 300 presenters, held in Honolulu, Hawaiʻi, in 1995, 2000, 2005, 2011, and 2016.

Ames has been a visiting professor at National University of Singapore and the Chinese University of Hong Kong, and a Fulbright Professor at Wuhan University and Peking University. He has received many awards, including the Confucian Culture Award at the 2013 World Congress of Confucianism in Beijing, and the Huilin Culture Award  from Beijing Normal University in China in 2016.

Selected works
Ames has written around 100 scholarly articles, published in prominent academic journals in the United States and abroad.

 Sunzi: The Art of Warfare (1993)
 The Art of Rulership: A Study of Ancient Chinese Political Thought (1994)
 Confucian Role Ethics: A Vocabulary (2011)

With D. C. Lau 
 Sun Pin: The Art of Warfare (1996)
 Yuan Dao: Tracing the Dao to Its Source (1998)
 Sun Bin: The Art of Warfare: A Translation of the Classic Chinese Work of Philosophy and Strategy (2003)

With David L. Hall 
 Thinking Through Confucius (1987) 
 Anticipating China: Thinking Through the Narrative of Chinese and Western Culture (1995) 
 Thinking From the Han: Self, Truth, and Transcendence in Chinese and Western Culture (1998) 
 Democracy of the Dead: Dewey, Confucius, and the Hope for Democracy in China (1999) 
 Focusing the Familiar: A Translation and Philosophical Interpretation of the Zhongyong (2001) 
 A Philosophical Translation of the Daodejing: Making This Life Significant (2003)

With Henry Rosemont Jr. 
 The Confucian Analects: A Philosophical Translation (1998)
 The Chinese Classic of Family Reverence: A Philosophical Translation of the Xiaojing (2008)
 Confucian Role Ethics: A Moral Vision for the 21st Century? (2016)

Edited 
 Wandering at Ease in the Zhuangzi (1998)
 The Aesthetic Turn: Reading Eliot Deutsch on Comparative Philosophy (1999)

Co-edited 
 Emotions in Asian Thought: A Dialogue in Comparative Philosophy, With a Discussion by Robert C. Solomon (1994) With Joel Marks
 Self as Person in Asian Theory and Practice (1994) With Thomas P. Kasulis and Wimal Dissanayake 
 Self and Deception: A Cross-Cultural Philosophical Enquiry (1996) With Wimal Dissanayake
 Self as Image in Asian Theory and Practice (1998) With Thomas P. Kasulis and Wimal Dissanayake
 Confucian Cultures of Authority (2006) With Peter D. Hershock
 Xu Bing and Contemporary Chinese Art: Cultural and Philosophical Reflections (2011) With Hsingyuan Tsao
 Value and Values: Economics and Justice in an Age of Global Interdependence (2015) With Peter D. Hershock
 Zhuangzi and the Happy Fish (2015) With Takahiro Nakajima
 Confucianisms for a Changing World Cultural Order (2017) With Peter D. Hershock
 Li Zehou and Confucian Philosophy (2018) With Jinhua Jia
 Having a Word with Angus Graham: At Twenty-Five Years into His Immortality (2018) with Carine DeFoort

Book chapters 
 "Putting Te back into Taoism" in Nature in Asian Traditions of Thought (1989) ed. J. Baird Callicott and Roger T. Ames
 "Understanding Order: The Chinese Perspective" in From Africa to Zen: An Invitation to World Philosophy (2003) ed. Robert C. Solomon and Kathleen Higgins
 "The Local and the Focal in Realizing a Daoist World" in Daoism and Ecology: Ways within a Cosmic Landscape (2001) ed. N.J. Girardot, James Miller and Liu Xiaogan

References and further reading 
 Jim Behuniak, ed., Appreciating the Chinese Difference: Engaging Roger T. Ames on Methods, Issues, and Roles  (Albany: SUNY Press,  2018).
 Ivanhoe, P. J. (1991). [Review of Thinking through Confucius, by D. L. Hall & R. T. Ames]. Philosophy East and West, 41.2: 241–254. https://doi.org/10.2307/1399773
 Kupperman, Joel J. (1989), "Review of Thinking Through Confucius," Harvard Journal of Asiatic Studies, 49.1,, 1989:251–59, https://doi.org/10.2307/2719305.
 Ian M. Sullivan, Joshua Mason, eds., One Corner of the Square: Essays on the Philosophy of Roger T. Ames (Honolulu: University of Hawaii Press, 2021).

Notes  

1947 births
Living people
20th-century Canadian philosophers
21st-century Canadian philosophers
Writers from Toronto
University of British Columbia alumni
National Taiwan University alumni
University of Hawaiʻi at Mānoa faculty
Alumni of SOAS University of London
Academic staff of Peking University
Chinese philosophy
Canadian expatriates in Hong Kong
Canadian expatriate academics in the United States
Canadian sinologists
Academic journal editors
Canadian expatriates in China